Emily D. Skeggs (born July 10, 1990) is an American actress and singer. She was nominated for the Tony Award for Best Featured Actress in a Musical in 2015 for playing the role of Medium Alison in Fun Home.

Early life and education
She was born in New York City, the daughter of Susan (née Casserly) and Gary Skeggs. Her father is a graphic designer, and her mother works in business. Skeggs graduated from Fiorello H. LaGuardia High School in 2008 and from Emerson College in 2012 with a degree in theatre and minor in writing. She wrote a play when she was six years old titled Star Girl which was performed at her school.

At LaGuardia she played the role of Oolie/Donna in City of Angels, in a cast that included Azealia Banks. At Emerson, she played Lady Macbeth in Macbeth, Hero in Much Ado About Nothing, and Maid Marian in Robin Hood.

Career

Skeggs played Muriel in Take Me Along at the Off-Broadway Irish Rep in 2008, 
 which was nominated for the Drama Desk Award for Outstanding Revival. She performed in the musical Ripcords at the New York International Fringe Festival in August 2008. Skeggs played Rebecca in the Huntington Theatre Company (Boston, Massachusetts) production of Our Town in December 2012. She returned to the Irish Rep in 2014 in the musical Transport, in which she played "Polly Cantwell". Also in 2014, she appeared in the Signature Theatre Company's production of And I and Silence as Young Dee.

Skeggs was the understudy in the Off-Broadway production of Fun Home in 2013 for the roles of Joan and Medium Alison. She replaced Alexandra Socha (who departed the show early due to personal reasons) in the role of Medium Alison in November 2013, and reprised the role for the Broadway production in 2015, making her Broadway debut. Skeggs was nominated for the Tony Award for Best Featured Actress in a Musical, and also received a Theatre World Award for her performance. She played the role of a young Roma Guy in When We Rise in 2017.

Credits

Theatre

Film

Television

Video games

Awards and nominations

References

External links

 
 

1990 births
American stage actresses
Living people
Actresses from New York City
21st-century American actresses
Emerson College alumni
Fiorello H. LaGuardia High School alumni
American musical theatre actresses
Theatre World Award winners